Bradley D. Hopkins (born September 5, 1970) is a former American football player. He played left tackle for 13 seasons in the National Football League (NFL), all of them with the Houston Oilers/Tennessee Titans organization.

Early years
Hopkins was an outstanding two-sport athlete at Moline High School, lettering in football as well as basketball. In football, Hopkins played on both offense and defense, playing on the defensive line as well as at tight end. In basketball, Hopkins played power forward, and was in the same lineup as future Iowa shot-blocker and NBA first-round draft pick Acie Earl.

College
Hopkins received a scholarship to play football for the Illinois Fighting Illini and was recruited by John Mackovic. As a freshman, Hopkins was a reserve offensive lineman, blocking for future NFL overall first pick Jeff George. George guided the Illini to the 1990 Florida Citrus Bowl against the Virginia Cavaliers after a 9–2 record, second only to the Michigan Wolverines in the Big Ten Conference.

His sophomore year, Hopkins became a starter, and started ten games at left tackle for quarterback Jason Verduzco. The Illini posted an 8–4 record, tied for first in the Big Ten and went to the Hall of Fame Bowl, losing to the Clemson Tigers. The following season, in 1991, Hopkins started all 12 games once again protecting Verduzco, and received All-Big Ten honors. The team posted a 6–6 record, good for fifth place in the Big Ten, and a trip to the 1991 John Hancock Bowl.

His senior year, Hopkins was selected team captain by first-year coach Lou Tepper, along with John Wright and Steven Mueller. He started all 12 games at left tackle and was named All-American as well as All-Big Ten. The Illini played in the 1992 Holiday Bowl, finishing with a 6–5–1 season.

Hopkins graduated from University of Illinois with a degree in Speech Communications.

Professional
Hopkins was selected in the first round of the 1993 NFL Draft by the Houston Oilers. In his rookie season, Hopkins started eleven games at left tackle and was named first-team All-Rookie by several organizations.

Hopkins started all sixteen games for the Oilers for the 1995, 1996, 1997, and 1999 seasons, blocking for fellow Big Ten alumnus Eddie George. In 1999, the Titans made it to Super Bowl XXXIV in which Hopkins started, however they lost to the Kurt Warner-led St. Louis Rams.

In 2000, Hopkins earned a trip to the Pro Bowl, starting in all but one game for the Tennessee Titans. Hopkins was part of an offensive line that allowed the third-lowest number of sacks in the NFL, and George gained over 1,500 yards rushing. That season, the Titans finished with a 13-3 record, winning the AFC Central Division, but lost to the Baltimore Ravens in the first round of the playoffs.

Hopkins continued starting for the Titans, and earned another trip to the Pro Bowl in 2003, starting all sixteen games for the fifth time in his career. The Titans were propelled by a high-powered offense with Steve McNair and Eddie George, which scored 30 points in six consecutive games – a franchise record.

He announced his retirement from football on June 14, 2006. Along with Steve McNair, he was the last player left from the Houston Oilers.

He currently works as an analyst for SiruisXM's ESPNU, B1G, ACC, SEC, Mad Dog Radio and NFL Radio.

External links
 http://www.nflplayers.com/players/player.aspx?id=20032
 https://www.pro-football-reference.com/players/HopkBr00.htm

1970 births
Living people
African-American players of American football
American football offensive tackles
Houston Oilers players
Tennessee Oilers players
Tennessee Titans players
American Conference Pro Bowl players
Illinois Fighting Illini football players
Players of American football from Columbia, South Carolina
21st-century African-American sportspeople
20th-century African-American sportspeople